The province of Pavia is a province in the region of Lombardy in northern Italy; its capital is Pavia.

History
The city Pavia was initially settled by the Ligures and was later occupied by Gaulish tribes; it was conquered by the Romans in 220 BCE. Named "Ticinum" by the Romans, the town was reinforced and became a key part of their defenses in northern Italy; despite this, the town was sacked by Attila, the ruler of the Hunnic Empire, in 452 CE, and then again by Odoacer in 476 CE. In the sixth century it was the capital of German tribe the Lombards and survived an attempted Frankish invasion. However, following the death of Charlemagne, the Lombard territory became part of Frankish territory.

In the 12th century, it became a commune after Frankish rule ceased, and Frederick I, Holy Roman Emperor fortified areas of the commune and he was crowned in Pavia in 1155. The University of Pavia was founded in 1361. Starting from 1359, Pavia and its neighbourhood were owned by the Visconti and then the Sforza of Milan, until, in 1499, the Duchy of Milan became a Spanish possession. It was the scene of a Franco-Imperial battle in 1525, in which Charles V, Holy Roman Emperor defeated Francis I of France. In 1707 and again 1774, parts of the so-called "principality of Pavia", a province of the Duchy under the Spaniards, were sold to Piedmont; these changes were restored after the collapse of the French Empire in 1814.

Geography
The Province of Pavia is in the region of Lombardy in northwestern Italy. It is bounded to the north by the provinces of Milan and Lodi, to the southeast by the Province of Piacenza (Emilia-Romagna), and to the southwest it is bounded by the Province of Alessandria (Piedmont). The province is crossed by the rivers Ticino and Po, which meet four kilometres south of the capital, Pavia. The province contains 190 communes and the River Po is navigable up to its confluence with the Ticino. There are three regions of the province, the Pavese, which is entirely in the Po Valley, the Lomellina, which is also completely in the Po Valley but between the Ticino and the Po, and Oltrepò, to the south of the Po and which includes Monte Lesima (1,724 m (5,656 ft)), a mountain in the Apennine Mountains which is the highest point in the province. The territory of Siccomario, at the confluence of the two great rivers, should properly be included in Lomellina, but for historical reasons it is considered part of Pavese. Another large river flowing through the province is the Olona.

The province is mostly flat with the northwestern part of the province being good agricultural land. The southern part rises to low hills which give way to the Ligurian Apennines. The town of Pavia has a major position in northern Italy's textile industry and is renowned for hatmaking. It also plays its part in the country's engineering and metallurgical industries. This is an important winemaking district and produces sparkling wines. It is the largest area in Italy for the production of  Pinot noir.

Municipalities
The list below shows the most populated municipalities of the province in 2010:

See also
 Comuni of the Province of Pavia

References

External links

Province of Pavia official website 
Oltrepò Pavese Touristic site 

 
Pavia
Pavia